Collection is the fifteenth and debut compilation album by Spyro Gyra, released in 1991 (see 1991 in music). The album cover showed a couple of fairies above a city with flowers.

The first two tracks are new recordings. "Mallet Ballet" is a live recording from a 1979 promo EP. "Harbor Nights" is from the live album Access All Areas. The remaining tracks are the original studio versions.

Track listing and personnel 
1. "You Can Count On Me" (Tom Schuman) - 3:27

Jay Beckenstein: Saxophone, Wind Synthesizer
Tom Schuman: Keyboards
Dave Samuels: Vibes, marimba
Julio Fernández: Guitars
Oscar Cartaya: Bass
Joel Rosenblatt: Drums
Marc Quiñones: Percussion

2. "What Exit" (Julio Fernandez) - 3:40

Jay Beckenstein: Saxophones
Tom Schuman: Keyboards
Dave Samuels: Marimba
Julio Fernandez: Guitars
Oscar Cartaya: Bass
Joel Rosenblatt: Drums
Marc Quiñones: Percussion

No Sweat Horns
Barry Danelian: Trumpet, flugelhorn, horn section arrangement
Randy Andos: Trombone
Scott Kreitzer: Tenor Saxophone

3. "Nu Sungo" (Manolo Badrena) - 4:10

Jay Beckenstein: Saxophones
Tom Schuman: Keyboards
Dave Samuels: Vibes, Marimba
Julio Fernandez: Guitar
Richie Morales: Drums
Roberto Vally: Bass
Manolo Badrena: Percussion

4. "The Unknown Soldier" (Jay Beckenstein) - 5:16

Jay Beckenstein: Saxophone
Tom Schuman: Keyboards
Dave Samuels: Vibes, marimba, timpani
Richie Morales: Drums
Oscar Cartaya: Bass

5. "Morning Dance" (Jay Beckenstein) - 3:57

Jay Beckenstein: Saxophones
Jeremy Wall: Electric piano 
Dave Samuels: Marimba, steel drums 
John Tropea: Guitars 
Jim Kurzdorfer: Bass 
Ted Reinhardt: Drums 
Rubens Bassini: Percussion

6. "Old San Juan" (Jay Beckenstein) - 6:41

Jay Beckenstein - Saxophone, whistle, percussion 
Dave Samuels - Marimba 
Jorge Dalto - Piano 
Rob Mounsey and Tom Schuman - Synthesizers 
Steve Love - Guitars 
Marcus Miller - Bass 
Steve Gadd - Drums 
Gerardo Velez - Percussion 
Manolo Badrena - Percussion

Horn Section:
Jerry Hey - Horn arrangement, trumpet, flugelhorn 
Gary Grant - Trumpet, flugelhorn 
Tom Scott - Saxophone, flute 
Larry Williams - Saxophone, flute 
Bill Reichenbach - Trombone

7. "Shakedown" (Jeremy Wall) - 4:22

Jay Beckenstein: Saxophone 
Tom Schuman: Keyboards 
Dave Samuels: Vibes, marimba 
Julio Fernandez: Guitars 
Richie Morales: Drums 
Kim Stone: Bass 
Gerardo Velez: Percussion

8. "Mallet Ballet" (Jeremy Wall) - 6:15

Jay Beckenstein: Saxophone 
Tom Schuman: Keyboards 
Chet Catallo: Guitar 
Eli Konikoff: Drums 
Jim Kurzdorfer: Bass 
Gerardo Velez: Percussion

9. "Catching the Sun" (Jay Beckenstein) - 4:41

Jay Beckenstein: Saxophone 
Tom Schuman: Electric piano, synthesizers 
Dave Samuels: Marimba, steel drums  
John Tropea - Guitar 
Hiram Bullock - Guitar 
Eli Konikoff - Drums 
Jim Kurzdorfer - Bass
Jeremy Wall: Synthesizers
Gerardo Velez - Percussion 
Rubens Bassini - Percussion 
Randy Brecker - Trumpet

10. "Para ti Latino" (Oscar Cartaya) - 4:15

Jay Beckenstein - Saxophone 
Tom Schuman - Keyboards 
Dave Samuels - Vibes, marimba 
Jay Azzolina - Guitar 
Richie Morales - Drums 
Oscar Cartaya - Bass 
Marc Quiñones - Percussion

No Sweat Horns: 
Barry Danielian - Trumpet, flugelhorn, horn section arrangements 
Randy Andos - Trombone 
Scott Kreitzer - Tenor saxophone

11. "Incognito" (Tom Schuman) - 5:56

Jay Beckenstein - Saxophone 
Tom Schuman - Keyboards 
Dave Samuels - Marimba 
Steve Love - Guitars 
Hiram Bullock - Guitars 
Rob Mounsey - Synthesizers,Vocorder 
Marcus Miller - Bass 
Steve Gadd - Drums 
Manolo Badrena - Percussion

12. "Harbor Nights" (Jay Beckenstein) - 6:52

Jay Beckenstein - Saxophone 
Tom Schuman - Keyboards 
Dave Samuels - Vibes, marimba 
Eli Konikoff - Drums 
Kim Stone - Bass 
Chet Catallo - Guitar 
Gerardo Velez - Percussion

13. "Limelight" (Dave Samuels) - 4:27

Jay Beckenstein - Saxophones 
Tom Schuman - Keyboards 
Dave Samuels - Vibes, Marimba 
Julio Fernandez - Guitars 
Richie Morales - Drums 
Oscar Cartaya - Bass

14. "Breakout: (Jeremy Wall) - 4:37

Jay Beckenstein - Saxophone 
Tom Schuman - Keyboards 
Dave Samuels - Vibes, marimba 
Julio Fernandez - Guitar 
Richie Morales - Drums 
Kim Stone - Bass 
Manolo Badrena - Percussion

References

1991 compilation albums
Spyro Gyra compilation albums